The 1935 Northeastern Huskies football team represented Northeastern University during the 1935 college football season. It was the program's third season and they finished with an undefeated record of 5–0–3. Their head coach was Alfred McCoy and their captain was Joe Chrusz.

The October 4th game against Alfred University was the first night game in New England history.

Schedule

References

Northeastern
Northeastern Huskies football seasons
College football undefeated seasons
Northeastern Huskies football